Kannaal Pesavaa ( Should I talk through my eyes) is a 2000 Indian Tamil-language film directed by Raj Khanna. The film featured Arun Kumar alongside Suvalakshmi, while Goundamani and Senthil play supporting roles. The film, which had music composed by Deva, opened in August 2000.

Cast
Arun Kumar as Arun
Suvalakshmi as Poongodi
Goundamani as Crendan
Senthil as Nelson Mandela
Vinu Chakravarthy
Manorama
Mansoor Ali Khan
Nizhalgal Ravi
King Kong
Alphonsa
K. S. Ravikumar
Lavanya as Sandhya (a fan of Arun)

Soundtrack
The soundtrack of the film includes 7 songs which were composed by Deva and lyrics written by M. Raaj Khanna.

Release
Initially scheduled for an April release in 2000, the film was delayed due to the presence of bigger budget films. The film opened in August 2000 to mixed reviews, with a critic noting "Bland is a word that can be used to describe every aspect of the rest of this movie" and that "there is nothing here that makes an impact or is memorable".

References

5 https://www.newtononlinetamal.com/2021/06/Kannal%20Pesava%20Songs.html

2000 films
2000s Tamil-language films